Operation Abilene  may refer to:
 Operation Abilene (1966) - a joint US-Australian military operation in 1966 during the Vietnam War.
 Operation Abilene (2003) - a US military operation in Al Anbar province in 2003 during the Iraq War.